Brima Pepito Sanusie (born April 13, 1985) is a Sierra Leonean footballer who currently plays for Martapura FC in the Liga Indonesia Premier Division .

References

External links

1985 births
Association football forwards
Sierra Leonean expatriate footballers
Sierra Leonean expatriate sportspeople in Indonesia
Sierra Leonean footballers
Expatriate footballers in Indonesia
Liga 1 (Indonesia) players
Living people
Persema Malang players
Persiba Balikpapan players
Persitara Jakarta Utara players
Persikabo Bogor players
Indonesian Premier Division players